Leandro Remondini (17 November 1917 – 9 January 1979) was an Italian association football player and manager, who played as a midfielder or as a defender.

Club career
Born in Verona, Remondini was a defensive midfielder, who capable of covering any midfield role for his teams and who could also play as a full-back. After playing two seasons in Serie B with Verona, he debuted in Serie A at 20 years of age with Milan, in the same year that Italy won the 1938 World Cup. During the war period, he went from Modena to Casale, and back to Modena, before heading for the capital. With Lazio he played his best football, scoring 19 goals in 95 games and earning a spot on the Italian team for the 1950 World Cup. After the World Cup he went to Napoli, and then ended his Serie A career with Lucchese.

International career
Remondini was the oldest player selected to the Italy national team for the 1950 World Cup. His one cap for the 'Azzurri' was in the team's 2–0 win against Paraguay.

Style of play
A versatile player, Remondini was capable of playing anywhere in midfield, and also as a defender, but was usually deployed as a defensive midfielder, or also as a full-back on occasion.

References

1917 births
1979 deaths
Footballers from Verona
Italian footballers
Association football midfielders
A.C. Milan players
S.S. Lazio players
Hellas Verona F.C. players
Modena F.C. players
S.S.D. Varese Calcio players
Casale F.B.C. players
S.S.C. Napoli players
Serie A players
Serie B players
Italy international footballers
1950 FIFA World Cup players
S.S.D. Lucchese 1905 players
Italian football managers
Beşiktaş J.K. managers
Italy B international footballers
U.S. Catanzaro 1929 managers
Italian expatriate football managers